Bright and Shiny is an album released by Columbia Records, featuring Doris Day backed by Neal Hefti's orchestra, on March 20, 1961. It was released in two forms; a monaural LP (catalog number CL-1614) and a stereophonic LP (catalog number CS-8414). A song of the same name was composed especially for this album. Neal Hefti directed the orchestra.

The album was combined with Day's 1959 album, Cuttin' Capers, on a compact disc, issued on November 13, 2001 by Collectables Records.

Track listing

References

1961 albums
Doris Day albums
Columbia Records albums
Albums arranged by Neal Hefti
Albums conducted by Neal Hefti